Tim Fly's Cause He's Having Fun is the first album by Fishboy.

Track listing
 Call it a Day
 The Eskimo and His Legion of Snowmen vs. the Lonely Space Cadet and the Mercury 7
 Let's Change Our Names
 So Long, Howard Huang
 Three Months on Your Head
 Emotion Ocean
 ...In My Freezer
 April O'Neil
 Go Away (Make Me a Sandwich)
 Crosswalk
 Teddy Ruxpin
 Robots!
 The Birthday Song

2007 albums
Fishboy (band) albums